Customs House, also known as the Old Customs House, is a historic customs house located at Sodus Point in Wayne County, New York.  It is a 25 feet wide by 35 feet deep, two story, Italianate style brick structure with sandstone trim built in 1874.  It was built originally as a bank building, then in 1885 was purchased by the Pennsylvania Railroad, who leased it to the U.S. government for use as a customs house and post office.  Government use of the building ceased in 1968.

It was listed on the National Register of Historic Places in 1980.

References

External links

Government buildings on the National Register of Historic Places in New York (state)
Government buildings completed in 1868
Buildings and structures in Wayne County, New York
Custom houses in the United States
National Register of Historic Places in Wayne County, New York
Custom houses on the National Register of Historic Places